Pike Island (or Pikes Island) is a Baffin Island offshore island located in the Arctic Archipelago in the territory of Nunavut. The island lies in Frobisher Bay, between Pugh Island and Fletcher Island.

References 

Uninhabited islands of Qikiqtaaluk Region
Islands of Frobisher Bay